Patrice Superville (born 8 April 1987) is a Trinidad and Tobago footballer who plays as a defender. She has been a member of the Trinidad and Tobago women's national team.

International goals
Scores and results list Trinidad and Tobago' goal tally first.

References

External links

1987 births
Living people
Women's association football defenders
Trinidad and Tobago women's footballers
People from Chaguanas
Trinidad and Tobago women's international footballers
Pan American Games competitors for Trinidad and Tobago
Footballers at the 2015 Pan American Games
Competitors at the 2018 Central American and Caribbean Games
College women's soccer players in the United States
Brewton–Parker College alumni
Trinidad and Tobago expatriate women's footballers
Trinidad and Tobago expatriate sportspeople in the United States
Expatriate women's soccer players in the United States